Superfast II may refer:

  in service under this name 1995–2003; later Spirit of Tasmania III, now Mega Express Four
  under construction at Nuovi Canterie Apuani, Marina di Carrara, Italy.  Expected to be delivered in the European summer/autumn 2009.

Ship names